The Mariners Radio Network is the name applied to the radio stations which carry Seattle Mariners baseball games throughout Washington state.

Stations are listed by state, then city. All stations broadcast on the AM band unless otherwise noted.

The announcers for the 2010 season were Dave Niehaus with play-by-play from the bottom of the fourth through the bottom of the fifth and again from the top of the eighth until the end of the game and Rick Rizzs with play-by-play starting from the top of the first through the top of the fourth and again for the sixth and seventh innings. If the Mariners went to extra innings, Niehaus did the odd innings and Rizzs did the even innings.  Niehaus died on November 10, 2010. For the 2011 season, Rizzs teamed with a rotating group of former Mariners announcers and players, including Ron Fairly, Ken Wilson, Ken Levine, Dave Valle, and Dan Wilson; this lineup was again used in the 2012 season. Aaron Goldsmith joined Rizzs as the club's radio announcing team at the start of the 2013 season.

Flagship history
With the start of the 2009 season, the network's flagship station is once again KIRO (710 ESPN Seattle), which became an affiliate of ESPN Radio in April 2009. Rival station KOMO AM 1000 had the broadcast rights for six seasons (2003-08).  The original flagship station for the franchise was KVI 570, which carried the broadcasts for the M's first eight seasons (1977-84) and the Seattle Pilots' only season (1969). KIRO's first run as the flagship station was for eighteen seasons (1985-2002).

Stations

Washington

See also
List of XM Satellite Radio channels
List of Sirius Satellite Radio stations

References

Seattle Mariners
Major League Baseball on the radio
Sports radio networks in the United States